Ilha de Santana Lighthouse is an active lighthouse on the namesake island located at the east entrance of the Baía de São Marcos, Maranhão, Brazil

Description
The first lighthouse was lit on June 1, 1831, though the construction has been authorized since June 1822. Soon after the lighthouse was threatened by the sea erosion and the efforts made to save it were unsuccessfully.

The original rotating system was transferred on the new lighthouse which was lit on January 26, 1961. Years later the sea erosion was damaging the second lighthouse, therefore a third lighthouse was built. It was built a cast iron pyramidal skeletal tower prefabricated in England by Armstrong, Mitchell and Company. The new white painted lighthouse was lit on December 2, 1883, and the lantern was equipped with a 2nd order of Fresnel lens, built by Chance Brothers, emitting a white and red light. With the passing of the years the cast iron tower underwent a progressive deteriorating, caused by the rust, and the construction of a new lighthouse was essential.

The lantern and the optical device were moved from the old lighthouse to the new one. The cast iron tower was partially dismantled and few years ago was completely demolished. The lighthouse is managed by Brazilian Navy and is identified by the country code number BR-0804.

See also
List of lighthouses in Brazil

References

External links
  Centro de Sinalização Náutica Almirante Moraes Rego
 Picture of the lighthouse

Lighthouses in Brazil